Thomas Edward Usherwood  (Christmas Eve 1841 - 9 February 1939) was Archdeacon of Maritzburg from 1878 to 1887.

Fogg was educated at Queens' College, Cambridge After Curacies in Leeds, Uffington and High Ercall he went out to South Africa in 1874. On his return to England in 1902 he held incumbencies at Chaldon Herring then Coombe Keynes.

References

1841 births
1939 deaths
Archdeacons of Maritzburg
Alumni of Queens' College, Cambridge
19th-century South African Anglican priests
20th-century English Anglican priests